Archibald McKellar (3 February 1816 – 11 February 1894) was briefly leader of Canada's Ontario Liberal Party from 1867 to 1868 and, unofficially, the first Leader of the Opposition in Ontario's new provincial legislature (though he was not officially recognised as such) and went on to serve as Commissioner of Public Works in Ontario Premier Oliver Mowat's first government.

He was born in Inveraray, Scotland in 1816 and came to Upper Canada with his parents in 1817. He helped on the family farm in Kent County and was also part owner of a large sawmill at Chatham. He served in the militia during the Upper Canada Rebellion. McKellar later moved to Chatham where he served on the town council and was also reeve from 1856 to 1857. He married Lucy McNab in 1836 but widowed in 1857. In 1857, he was elected to the Legislative Assembly of the Province of Canada for Kent and he served until Confederation. He was defeated by Rufus Stephenson when he ran in Kent in the 1867 election, but he was elected to the 1st Parliament of Ontario for Bothwell in 1867 and 1871. He married a second to Mary Catherine Powell in 1874.

He was elected in the new district of Kent East in 1875. However, the opposition had accused him of taking advantage of his position to award contracts to his friends. Although he was cleared of any wrongdoing, he retired from politics in 1875 and was appointed sheriff in Wentworth County. He died in Hamilton in 1894.

The township of McKellar in Parry Sound District was named in his honour.

References

External links
Biography at the Dictionary of Canadian Biography Online
Archibald McKellar

1816 births
1894 deaths
Canadian Presbyterians
Leaders of the Ontario Liberal Party
Ontario Liberal Party MPPs
Members of the Legislative Assembly of the Province of Canada from Canada West
Scottish emigrants to pre-Confederation Ontario
Immigrants to Upper Canada